Cecil Clarence "Sonny" Humphreys (May 17, 1914 – June 14, 1995) was an American college football player and coach, athletics administrator, professor, and university president. He served as the head football coach at Memphis State College—renamed from West Tennessee State Teachers College in 1941 and known as the University of Memphis from 1939 to 1941, compiling a record of 14–16. Humphreys was also the athletic director at Memphis State from 1947 to 1960 the president of the university from 1960 to 1973. The Cecil C. Humphreys School of Law at the University of Memphis is named for him.

Humphreys was born in Paris, Tennessee and attended E.W. Grove Henry County High School, where he played on the school's undefeated football team in 1929. He moved on to the University of Tennessee, where he played football as an end from 1933 to 1935. Humphreys received a bachelor's degree in 1936 and a master's degree in 1938 from the Univeristy of Tennessee. He earned a doctorate from New York University (NYU) in 1957.

Humphreys began his teaching career in 1936 as a history instructor at the University of Tennessee Junior College—now known as the University of Tennessee at Martin. In 1937, he moved on to Memphis State to again teach history.

Humphreys died on June 14, 1995, at this home in Memphis, Tennessee.

Head coaching record

References

1914 births
1995 deaths
American football ends
Memphis Tigers athletic directors
Memphis Tigers football coaches
Vanderbilt Commodores football players
Presidents of the University of Memphis
University of Memphis faculty
University of Tennessee at Martin faculty
New York University alumni
People from Paris, Tennessee
Coaches of American football from Tennessee
Players of American football from Tennessee